Lasioglossum halictoides, also known as the Lasioglossum (Australictus) davide , is a species of bee in the subgenus Australictus of the genus Lasioglossum, in the Halictidae family. It was first described in 1910 by Theodore Dru Alison Cockerell as Halictus davidis, from a specimen collected at Kuranda, Queensland.

References

davide
Insects described in 1910